Rita Pogosova is a former female table tennis player from Soviet Union. She won a gold medal in the Women's team event at the World Table Tennis Championships in 1969.

References

Soviet table tennis players
Sportspeople from Baku